Arksey railway station, originally named Stockbridge and later Arksey and Stockbridge was a station which served the villages of Arksey and Stockbridge in the English county of South Yorkshire. It was served by trains on the main line between Doncaster and York.

History
The station was opened by the Great Northern Railway and became part of the London and North Eastern Railway during the Grouping of 1923, passing on to the Eastern Region of British Railways during the nationalisation of 1948. It was then closed by British Railways on 5 August 1952.

The site today
Trains still pass at speed on the now electrified East Coast Main Line.

References

External links
 Station on navigable O.S. map Station site is at centre of map

Disused railway stations in Doncaster
Former Great Northern Railway stations
Railway stations in Great Britain opened in 1848
Railway stations in Great Britain closed in 1952